Jason Emmanuel Petty  (born May 27, 1979), better known by his stage name Propaganda, is an American Christian rapper, spoken word artist, and poet from Los Angeles, California. He has released seven albums as an independent artist, including one collaborative album with Odd Thomas and one with Derek Minor, and has performed and recorded as a member of the underground hip hop group Tunnel Rats and associated act Footsoldiers.

Biography and musical career
Petty was born Jason Emmanuel Petty on May 27, 1979 in Los Angeles, California. In his very early childhood, his family moved into a violent, ethnically Mexican neighborhood. As the only black child in the area, he was often teased due to his skin color. Later, his family moved again, this time to the suburbs, where his family was known as the "poor black family." He learned to rap, and also took up dance, graffiti, and formal drawing and painting. Discovered by underground hip hop collective Tunnel Rats, he made his debut in 2002 on Speak Life by Sev Statik. In 2003, Petty joined the Tunnel Rats, and on April 8, 2003, released his solo debut album with UpRok Records, entitled Out of Knowhere. In 2006 he released the I Am Not Them EP with Tunnel Rat Music and recorded Live This as part of Tunnel Rats-affiliated group Footsoldiers. Footsoldiers also collaborated with KRS-One on his album Life, with Petty appearing on the song "I Ain't Leaving". Petty released a second solo EP, The Sketchbook: A Small Collection of Unreleased Material, independently in 2008, and his second album, Listen Watch Focus, also came out in 2008 through End of Earth Records.

Petty then released four albums through the Portland-based Humble Beast Records. The first, entitled Art Ambidextrous, was recorded as a dual-album with Odd Thomas, and came out on February 1, 2011. Petty's next album, Excellent, came out in 2012, and charted at No. 7 on the Billboard Top Gospel chart. Petty's fourth solo album, Crimson Cord, came out on April 29, 2014, and also charted successfully. He dropped Crooked, a project that asked serious political and social questions, on June 30, 2017.

Propaganda has traveled the country on several tours, including the "Unlimited Up" tour with Murs and the "Spotlight" tour with Sho Baraka in 2016, as well as the "Tension Tour" with Kings Kaleidoscope in 2017.

Other activities
In addition to his hip hop career, Jason Petty has worked as a youth pastor, led a poetry team called Selah, and helped his sister's dance ministry called "Live." In 2013, he partnered with I Am Second in hosting a poetry contest, Spoken Word Challenge. In 2017, Petty and his wife, Dr. Alma Zaragoza-Petty, recorded "The Red Couch Podcast," an eight-episode series in which they discussed social justice issues. He began the "Hood Politics with Prop" podcast in 2020. In mid-2020, Petty appeared as a guest co-host on the Behind the Police podcast mini-series of the iHeartRadio podcast Behind the Bastards with journalist Robert Evans. On this podcast, Evans explained the history of the American police, with Petty reacting to Evans's explanation and adding additional commentary of his own. In early 2021, Petty also appeared as a guest co-host on Evans' Behind the Insurrections mini-series.

Discography

 Out of Knowhere – 2003
 Listen Watch Focus – 2008
 Art Ambidextrous (with Odd Thomas) – 2011
 Excellent – 2012
 Crimson Cord – 2014
 Crooked – 2017
 Nothing But a Word (with Derek Minor) – 2019
 Terraform: The People (with DJ Mal-Ski) - 2021
Terraform: The Sky (with L's) - 2021

Filmography

References

External links
 
 Interview in 2021 with Pop-Talk Podcast of WAER-FM

1979 births
Living people
African-American male rappers
African-American Christians
American evangelicals
African-American poets
American performers of Christian hip hop music
Rappers from Los Angeles
Tunnel Rats (music group) members
21st-century American rappers
21st-century American poets
21st-century American male musicians